"The Bright Sun" is a German fairy tale collected by the Brothers Grimm in Grimm's Fairy Tales, tale number 115.

It is Aarne-Thompson type 960, The Sun Brings All to Light.

Synopsis
A tailor's apprentice robs and murders a Jew on the road, despite the Jew saying he has nothing worth stealing. As the Jew dies, he warns, "The bright sun will bring it to light."  The man then settles down.  One day, he sees the sunlight reflecting from his coffee and jeers about its bringing "it" to light.  His wife bothers him until he tells her what he means. She gossips about it, and he is arrested and executed.

Variants
The Grimms also recorded a version where the threat of that birds would bring it to light, and the man laughed at a partridge because of it.

See also
The Jew Among Thorns
The Good Bargain

References

Grimms' Fairy Tales
Antisemitism in literature
ATU 850-999